Maurício Mattar (born 3 April 1964) is a Brazilian actor.

Biography 
Maurício Mattar was born in Rio de Janeiro, the son of Jarbas Mattar and Liedir Mattar. He is of Lebanese origin. Mattar is the nephew of the great pianist Pedro Mattar.

Career 

Mauricio Mattar participated in the film False Blond directed by Carlos Reichenbach. He is also a singer, having recorded some records and sung on the weekly television program "Domingão do Faustão" on the Rede Globo Brazilian network.

Filmography
In the cinema 
 False Blond - in final phase
 1990 - The Cat of Extraterrestre Boots
 1989 - Kuarup
 1987 - Johnny Love
 1986 - Said cinema (documentary)

In the television
2019 - Topíssima - Carlos Dominguez
2018 - Jesus - Joachim
2013 - Dona Xepa - Júlio César Pantaleão
2010 - S.O.S. Emergência - Vinícius
2010 - Na Forma da Lei
2008 - Casos e Acasos - Diego 
2006/2007 - O Profeta - Henrique
2005 - A Lua Me Disse - Lúcio
2003/2004 - Agora É que São Elas - Pedro 
2001/2002 - A Padroeira - Dom Fernão de Avelar 
2001 - Sítio do Picapau Amarelo - Tupã
2001 - Porto dos Milagres - Frederico Vieira
1999 - Louca Paixão - André
1998 - Mulher - Carlos Corrêa Lopes
1996 - O Fim do Mundo'' - Lucas
1994 - A Viagem - Teodoro Dias (Téo) Encarnação de Alexandre Toledo ( Guilherme fontes)
1993/1994 - O Mapa da Mina - Bakur Shariff 
1992/1993 - Pedra sobre Pedra - Leonardo 
1990 - Lua Cheia de Amor - Augusto
1990 - Rainha da Sucata - Rafael
1989 - O Salvador da Pátria - Sérgio
1987 - Bambolê - Murilo
1986 - Cambalacho - Porthos
1985/1986 - Roque Santeiro - João Ligeiro

Personal life 
He had a relationship with the Brazilian actress Paola Oliveira.

References

1964 births
Living people
Male actors from Rio de Janeiro (city)
Brazilian people of Lebanese descent
Brazilian male film actors
20th-century Brazilian male singers
20th-century Brazilian singers
Brazilian male telenovela actors